The A 6 road is an A-Grade trunk road in Sri Lanka. It connects Ambepussa with Trincomallee.

The A 6 passes through Alawwa, Polgahawela, Kurunegala, Ibbagamuwa, Melsiripura, Galewala, Dambulla, Habarana, Gal Oya, Alut Oya, Kantale and Thampalakamam to reach Trincomallee.

A06 highway
Transport in Eastern Province, Sri Lanka